Jamu Mare (or Großscham) is a commune in Timiș County, Romania. It is composed of five villages: Clopodia, Ferendia, Gherman, Jamu Mare (commune seat) and Lățunaș.

Name 
In Romanian the name means "Greater Jam/Žam". On the other side of the border, in Serbia, there is a village called Mali Žam ("Smaller Jam/Žam").

History 
Jamu Mare was first mentioned in a document in 1335, under the name Jam. In 1370 it belonged to Krassó County and was called Suma. In Marsigli's notes from 1690–1700 it is called Seham and appears with 67 houses. Between 1730–1740 a plague epidemic decimated the population. Thus, with the third German colonization, a new locality was established a little further west of the old settlement. Then 152 houses were built. In 1786, 30 families settled here, and in the autumn of the next year the rest of the newcomers. It was then called Freudenthal. The administration moved the Romanians to the border area, and the houses were assigned to the Germans. At the end of the 18th century, Hungarian statistician  recorded that the village called Nagy-Zsám had a population of 1,562 and belonged to the nobleman László Karácsonyi. In 1807 another wave of German colonists from Torontál County settled here. 1809 is considered the year of the effective establishment of the new locality, on the current location. The old Freudenthal colony was gradually abandoned by the Germans, who preferred to move to Jamu Mare, and in 1893, the territory of the colony was incorporated into the current commune.

Demographics 

Jamu Mare had a population of 2,971 inhabitants at the 2011 census, down 11% from the 2002 census. Most inhabitants are Romanians (88.22%), larger minorities being represented by Hungarians (3.94%) and Roma (2.79%). For 3.3% of the population, ethnicity is unknown. By religion, most inhabitants are Orthodox (77.25%), but there are also minorities of Roman Catholics (10.91%), Greek Catholics (3.87%) and Baptists (2.56%). For 3.3% of the population, religious affiliation is unknown.

Transport 
Jamu Mare is now a railway terminus, but between 1925 and 1930, trains would pass through it all the way to Vršac in present-day Serbia. The rail station is currently closed, without service.

Four county roads run through the commune.

Notes

References 

Communes in Timiș County
Localities in Romanian Banat
Romania–Serbia border crossings